Mococo is a former unincorporated community, now annexed to the city of Martinez, located in Contra Costa County, East Bay region, California. It became known as Mococo following the 1905 arrival of a smelting works, operated by the Mountain Copper Company (Mo Co Co).

It lies at an elevation of 10 feet (3 m), south of the Carquinez Strait in eastern Martinez.

References

Martinez, California
Neighborhoods in Contra Costa County, California